Joe Eddie Lopez (born December 8, 1939) is a former member of both the Arizona State Senate and the Arizona House of Representatives. He served in the House from January 1989 until January 2001, and in the Senate from January 2001 through January 2003. She was first elected to the House in November 1990, representing District 22, and was re-elected in 1992 and 1994. In 1996 he ran for the State Senate from the district, and won. He was re-elected in 1998 and 2000. He did not run for re-election in 2002.

References

Democratic Party Arizona state senators
Hispanic and Latino American state legislators in Arizona
Democratic Party members of the Arizona House of Representatives
1939 births
Living people